Andreas Holm may refer to:
 Andreas Holm (politician) (1906–2003), Norwegian politician
 Andreas Holm (singer), German Schlager singer and composer